Terrier-Rouge is a commune in the Trou-du-Nord Arrondissement, in the Nord-Est department of Haiti. It has 21,328 inhabitants.

Communal Sections 
The commune consists of two communal sections, namely:
 Fond Blanc, urban and rural, containing the town of Terrier Rouge
 Grand Bassin, urban and rural, containing the town of Grand Bassin

References

Populated places in Nord-Est (department)
Communes of Haiti